Tomáš Zdechovský (born 2 November 1979) is a Czech politician, crisis manager, media analyst, poet and author. Since 2014 he has been a Member of the European Parliament with KDU-ČSL, which is part of the European Peoples Party.

Background 
Tomáš Zdechovský has earned three master's degrees. Two of them at the University of South Bohemia, České Budějovice (Pastoral Assistant and Educator of Free Time). The third he made at the Masaryk University in Media studies. He also holds a bachelor's degree in Political Communication which he earned at the Salesian Pontifical University. Since 2006, he regularly gives lectures on crisis communication, crisis management and crisis communication in politics at various universities.

2004 he founded the PR and communication company Commservis.com, which he ran in a position of Chief Executive until he was elected as a Member of the European Parliament MEP. He also managed its subsidiary company WIFI Czech republic.

He is a member of the KDU-ČSL and in 2007–2008 served as its regional manager in the Pardubice region. He ran for the European Parliament for the first time in 2009 on the 14th place of party list, however he was not elected.
He received much appraisal and great response for his nomination speech at the Congress of KDU-ČSL, held in June 2013 in Olomouc. In European Parliament Elections 2014 he ran for the KDU-ČSL for the second time. He was placed on the 3rd place of the party list and was elected a Member of the European Parliament for the 8th legislature of the house. In 2019 he ran for the European Parliament for the third time and was reelected.

On 2 December 2019 he announced his intention to run for chairman of KDU-ČSL. However, at a party conference he announced, that he had decided to withdraw his candidacy and instead he ran for the deputy chairman of the party and was eventually elected.

Member of the European Parliament 
Since 2014 Tomáš Zdechovský has been dealing the Michalák Case. He criticises the practice of the Norwegian Barnevernet and Norwegian child protection policy as a whole, and demands its change. In late 2014, together with his fellow MEP Petr Mach, he began to actively engage in a campaign to return of Eva Michaláková's two sons, who had been taken away by Norwegian local Child Welfare Service. Both MEPs organized money collection for counsel in mother's litigation. He also initiated an open letter to the Norwegian authorities, which was signed by nearly 50 MEPs from different countries and factions in the European Parliament.
He is also the author of the introduction to the book Stolen Childhood: The Truth About Norway's Child Welfare System. The book was published in 2019 and deals with the issue of taking children away from their parents by Norwegian child protection service Barnevernet, the causes of the great influence of this institution and the reasons of the frequent criticism of Barnevernet for human rights violations.

Several times Tomáš Zdechovský has also commented on the European migrant crisis and in July 2015, he visited a couple of refugee camps in Sicily. He said, most of the people in local refugee camps were actually economic migrants. Furthermore, his criticism is aimed at Greece, which according to his words has neglected the border controls and registration of newcomers. In this respect he also published an article in a renowned scientific publication by the Potomac Institute in Washington D.C.

As an MEP, Tomáš Zdechovský also called for further investigation of Andrej Babiš on the grounds of alleged fraud in obtaining EU subsidies, which were designated for small businesses and where actual ownership of a farm and convention center called Stork Nest by Mr. Babiš was allegedly concealed. Mr. Zdechovský also referred to alleged conflict of interest of Andrej Babiš in receiving EU subsidies for the Agrofert group, due to suspicion, that Babiš is still actual owner even when a member of the Czech government.

As an MEP, he has also pointed out the problem of mileage fraud, which concerns the second-hand car market in the Czech Republic in particular and other EU countries in Central and Eastern Europe in general. Tomáš Zdechovský argues, that the introduction of the Car-Pass System, which is being applied in Belgium since 2006, throughout the EU is an effective way to tackle and prevent such fraud, (illicit manipulations with odometers) throughout the EU.

Tomáš Zdechovský has also long been involved in the cases of Czech truck drivers in England and France, who have gotten into trouble when their vehicle checks revealed that illegal migrants had got into the cargo area without consciousness of drivers.

Poet and author 
Tomáš Zdechovský is co-founder of the group of poets called Friends of the Silent Poetic Touch (Přátelé tichého dotyku) and the author of its manifesto protesting against the cultural decline of Czech society. Literary critics count him among the representatives of the contemporary Catholic modern poetry. Zdechovský, however, considers himself a representative of the "dotekysmus" (from Czech dotek = touch), which emphasises the playfulness and simplicity of the verses that have human touch and emotion, which is built on the emotional experience of verses.
He has published four collections of poems: Ze zahrady mé milé (From the Garden of my Beloved One), which was  translated into Hebrew, some poems have also been translated into English, German, Italian, French, Russian and Ukrainian), Odpusť mým rtům (Forgive My Lips), Intimní doteky (Intimate Touches) and the most recent one is Kapka (The Drop).

In 2013, he published his first novel Nekonečné ticho (Infinite Silence), which is about the relationship between a young man with an older woman. The book was illustrated by painter and graphic artist Klára Klose.

Other Activities 
In late 2008 Tomáš Zdechovský was one of the founders of an initiative called Save Baby Jesus (in Czech Zachraňte Ježíška) which aims at defending Czech Christmas traditions against Santa Claus. Similarly, together with Roman Celý, Christian Democratic Member of the Czech parliament, both criticised the replacement of the "peaceful" Czech All Souls Day (dušičky) in local schools with that "crazy" American holiday, Halloween.

In 2012, he was the main organiser of the proposal for the establishment of a bishopric for the region of Vysočina. The signature initiative was supported by former chair of the KDU-ČSL Jan Kasal, regional chairman TOP 09, Jiři Blazek and the Regional Councillor, Tomáš Škaryd (ČSSD). However the Roman Catholic parish in Jihlava, distanced itself from the suggestion and dubbed these initiative rather ridiculous.

Since December 2017 he has also been a member of the Advisory Board of the Inter-Parliamentary Council to Combat Terrorism.

Selected Peer Reviewed Articles in English 
 Fialová, J. – Zdechovský, T., The influence of the possible ratification of the Istanbul Convention on divorce disputes in the Czech Republic considering different theories of the incidence of violence. In: Journal of Nursing, Social Studies, Public Health and Rehabilitation 3–4, 2020, pp. 89–106.
 Chloupková, J. – Svendsen G.T. – Zdechovský T., A Global Meat Tax: From Big Data to a Double Dividend, In Agricultural Economics.
 Zdechovský, T. 2007. A Short Discussion of Crisis Management – Practical Experience with the 2006 Electoral Campaign in the Czech Republic, In Středoevropská studie (Central European Political Studies Review), Brno, Mezinárodní politologický ústav Masarykovy univerzity, vol. IX, issue 2–3, pp. 139–150.
 Chloupková J. – Svendsen G. T. – Zdechovský T., Do Strategic Foresight and Policy Making Go Hand in Hand? Security in the European Union, In Journal of Contemporary Management, Academic Research Centre of Canada, vol V., issue 3, pp. 33–41, 2016.
 Zdechovský T., Refused asylum seekers must be returned!, In Terrorism: An Electronic Journal and Knowledge Base, Inter University Center for Terrorism Studies, Vol. VI, No. 1, pp. 1–3.

References

External links
 Articles by Tomáš Zdechovský on Euractiv.com
 MEP Ranking 
 Tomáš Zdechovský website

1979 births
Living people
KDU-ČSL MEPs
Czech poets
Czech male poets
MEPs for the Czech Republic 2014–2019
Masaryk University alumni
University of South Bohemia alumni
MEPs for the Czech Republic 2019–2024
Politicians from Havlíčkův Brod